Cambodia made its Paralympic Games début at the 2000 Summer Paralympics in Sydney (sending only a men's volleyball team), and has competed in every edition of the Summer Paralympics since then. Cambodia has never taken part in the Winter Paralympics, and has never won a Paralympic medal.

Full results for Cambodia at the Paralympics

See also
 Cambodia at the Olympics

References